George Speak (7 November 1890 – 10 March 1953) was an English professional footballer who played as a full-back.

References

1890 births
1953 deaths
People from Blackburn
English footballers
Association football fullbacks
Clitheroe F.C. players
Darwen F.C. players
West Bromwich Albion F.C. players
Grimsby Town F.C. players
Gainsborough Trinity F.C. players
West Ham United F.C. players
Preston North End F.C. players
Leeds United F.C. players
English Football League players